The Degodi lark (Mirafra gilletti degodiensis) is a lark in the family Alaudidae endemic to Ethiopia.  It is now considered a subspecies of Gillett's lark.

Taxonomy and systematics
Formerly, the Degodi lark was considered to be a separate species, but was re-classified as a subspecies of Gillett's lark in 2012 by the IOC. Many other authorities have not yet followed this taxonomic change. The alternate name "Sidamo lark" is also used as alternate name by Archer's lark. Other alternate names include Degodi bushlark and Erard's lark.

Description
The Degodi lark is a small (14 cm long), slender lark, with abundant streaking, very similar to a pipit. There are markings on the breast faint on light, buff underbelly. The voice is a 4- to 6-note trill; twill-ill-ill-ill-ill, and shorter tsee-tsee.

Distribution and habitat
There is, at present, no more than a rough sketch of the Degodi lark, gleaned from infrequently gathered facts. This, as well, goes for its population and range, but it is believed to have a very small population. Its known range covers about 400 square kilometres, possibly up to 2,000 square kilometres. It is seen most reliably east of Bogol Manya, Ethiopia. Its natural habitat is subtropical or tropical dry shrubland and is found among low acacia bushes on bare soil, with scattered Commiphora bushes and other species.

Behaviour and ecology
Degodi larks are often seen using bushes for perches. It eats caterpillars and small orthopterans.

Status
It is threatened by habitat loss.

References

Collar, N. J., C. Dingle, M. N. Gabremichael, and C. N. Spottoswoode. 2009. Taxonomic status of the Degodi Lark Mirafra degodiensis, with notes on the voice of Gillett's Lark M. gilletti. Bulletin of the British Ornithologists' Club 129: 49-62

Degodi lark
Endemic birds of Ethiopia
Degodi lark
Degodi lark
Taxonomy articles created by Polbot